Chua Ek Kay (21 November, 1947 – 8 February 2008) was a Singaporean artist hailed as the "bridge between Asian and Western art" with a unique painting style using Chinese ink on paper that demonstrated an ingenious blend of traditional Chinese painting forms with Western art theories and techniques. Most of his works were themed of Chinatown street scenes, lotuses, and abstract works inspired by Australian aboriginal cave paintings.

Early years
Chua Ek Kay was born in Guangdong, China, on 1947, the eldest of seven children. In the 1950s, his family migrated to Singapore, and settled in Liang Seah Street. Chinese cultural influences were very much a part of his daily life and art, and as a child Chua picked up Chinese literature and poetry, and practised writing Chinese characters with his father. Even in school, he often took part in calligraphy and classical poetry activities as a student at the Catholic High School. He excelled in both areas, writing his own poems and becoming known in school for his excellent poetic calligraphy. This reputation soon spread to local calligraphy and poetic circles.

In 1975, the 28-year-old Chua became a student of Chinese brush painting and seal-carving of Singaporean master ink painter, Fan Chang Tien.

Artistic career
Though he was deeply passionate about art, Chua continued to make his living by taking on a variety of jobs. Finally, in 1985, he resigned his post as a manager of a garment factory to become a full-time artist. At the age of 38 he embarked on his artistic journey, supplementing his income as a lecturer with the Extramural Studies Department of the National University of Singapore.

He began exploring his ideas about art, breaking away from traditionalist Shanghai School-styled subjects. Remembering his childhood days in Liang Seah Street and its community, Chua found new inspirations in his paintings from mountains and lakes, to shophouses and even abstract works inspired by Australian aboriginal cave paintings.

As he explored new expressions in art, he found similarities between the Shanghai School style and the works of Western artists like Henri Matisse, Pablo Picasso and Jackson Pollock in terms of artistic spontaneity. This new-found interest in Western art led him to study the subject at the Lasalle-SIA College of the Arts (now the LASALLE College of the Arts) in 1990. He was also to spend several more years engaged in a comparative study of eastern and western concepts in painting in Australia, receiving a Bachelor of Fine Arts (BFA) from the University of Tasmania and a Master of Arts (MA (Hons)) from the University of Western Sydney. Nevertheless, the Chinese brush style which he had picked up earlier never left him, and its influence continued to flow in his paintings.

On 21 August 2006, Chua launched his "Street Scenes Collection" series of paintings at the Singapore Management University (SMU). Valued at S$302,000, these 30 works depict scenes of old shop houses, narrow alleyways, historic sites and other memories portraying Singapore's heritage, in his signature brush styles – a legacy of 20 years of artistic practice. He officially donated this Collection to the University on 18 October 2006, in support of the University's "Visual Arts Initiative" launched earlier in the year. SMU subsequently published a book entitled Chua Ek Kay: Singapore Street Scenes, Evoking Memories (2007).

Lee Boon Yang, the Minister for Information, Communications and the Arts, said of the artist: "Ek Kay has developed a unique style of his own. When one looks at his paintings, one is reminded how a simple approach to life can translate into something powerful. I find his paintings particularly interesting in the way he injects so much passion and emotion into a minimalist landscape."

Aesthetics and philosophy in his art

When Chua was under the tutelage of Fan Chang Tien, he not only learnt the four elements of the "Shanghai School" – calligraphy, classical poetry, painting and seal-carving from his master. Fan drilled him in the principles of 花鸟 (or "flower–bird"), and enforced Chua's foundations in his art. This also intensified his interest in art, studying the aesthetics of post-Ming Dynasty masters particularly of Shih-Tao.

Fan Chang Tien also reminded Chua to be expressive in whatever subject matter he painted, for there was rhythm with each stroke. This "life" in his paintings also had to come with an understanding of "black within black", expressing art through different gradations of ink tones to capture a "simplistic complexity" in the depiction of the subject matter.

As he explored Western ideas in his art, he found that the difference between western and eastern art lay solely in their spirits: western art was forceful, and eastern art more introspective. He also found that the emergence of "east-west art fusion" in art adopted by pioneer Singapore artists in the 1950s and 1960s was partly due to the Cultural Revolution. That Revolution not only closed China's door from the rest of the world, it also locked away its "conventional Chinese art themes of snowy peaks and gushing rivers" that were identified with by Chinese artists overseas. Singapore artists then realized they did not really relate to these conventional art themes and they should adopt familiar subjects that they could distill through their emotion and artistry. Many artists in that period were also English-educated, and thus adopted western ideas as alternative sources of art. While Chua's creations are infused with Western artistic spontaneity, he felt that tradition continued to play an important role in breaking new ground and generating inspirations in art.

Chua continued to practise Han calligraphy and ink-brush painting, as he believed that while a contemporary painting had to keep up with the times and embody an artist's temperament and the ideals he stands for, in creating art he should be rooted to certain basic rules and formats. The discipline of Chinese art helped to strengthen his lines, while western techniques helped him in the mixing of tones. These techniques formed the basis of his art.

Death and tributes

On 8 February 2008, Chua died at the age of 61 after having battled nasal cancer since 2004.

"With Chua's passing," said Edmund Cheng, the Chairman of the National Arts Council, "Singapore has lost a great artist and a towering talent... To his friends and fellow artists, Ek Kay was a man of few words, and was always respected for his quiet confidence and humility despite his outstanding international success. Ek Kay was an exemplary artist who had left us at his peak."

On 18 March 2008, The Nanyang Academy of Fine Arts paid tribute to Chua with a roundtable session titled Remembering Chua Ek Kay: Ink Painting and the Idea of the Contemporary. Using Chua's works as the basis for discussion, the forum sought to engage the audience in a discussion on the meaning of contemporary art in Singapore. Guest speaker Joanna Lee, author of Chua Ek Kay: Singapore Street Scenes, Evoking Memories (2007), together with artists Cheo Chai-Hiang and Hong Sek Chern, touched on Chua's creations and the development of his ideas over the years.

This was followed by a memorial service for Chua, on 17 May 2008, organised jointly by the Singapore Art Museum and Singapore Management University (SMU). The service marked the 100th day of the artist's death, with tributes delivered by Museum director Kwok Kian Chow, arts patron Koh Seow Chuan, the late artist's widow Mdm Yeo Yang Kwee and many other people whom Chua had worked with in his lifetime. Mdm Yeo also unveiled two untitled paintings at the service, and announced her donation of Chua's "representative collection" to the Art Museum.

Major exhibitions

Notes

Further reading

Resource Guides
 National Online Repository of the Arts Resource Guide on Chua Ek Kay

News reports
.
.
.
.
.
.
.
.

Books and exhibition catalogues
Singapore Management University (2018), A Long Way from Home, Singapore: Singapore Management University, 
.
 – exhibition catalogue.
.
.
 – exhibition catalogue.
.
 – catalogue of an exhibition at Caldwell House, CHIJMES, 20–23 September 1997, and at Art Forum, Singapore, 24 September – 6 October 1997.
 – catalogue of an exhibition at the National Museum Art Gallery, 9–13 September 1992, sponsored by the United Overseas Bank Group, Singapore.
 – exhibition catalogue.
 – exhibition catalogue.
.
 – catalogue of an exhibition presented by the Extramural Studies Department of the National University of Singapore.

1947 births
2008 deaths
Singaporean artists
Singaporean ink painters
Recipients of the Cultural Medallion for art
Deaths from cancer in Singapore
Singaporean people of Chinese descent
Painters from Guangdong
Western Sydney University alumni
University of Tasmania alumni
20th-century Singaporean painters